European Union Force RCA, commonly referred as EUFOR RCA, is the United Nations-mandated European Union peacekeeping mission in Bangui, capital of the Central African Republic. The goal of the mission is to stabilize the area after more than a year of internal conflict. Agreement about the mission was reached in January 2014, and the first operations started at the end of April. The mission ended its mandate after nearly a year on 15 March 2015.

Background 
In 2012 the Central African Republic was embroiled in internal conflict, resulting in the ousting of the Christian president François Bozizé in March 2013. Michel Djotodia, the leader of Muslim Séléka rebels, assumed the presidency but was himself forced to resign in January 2014. According to the UN Refugee Agency, 37,000 people have escaped to neighboring countries, while 173,000 have been internally displaced. In December 2013, peacekeeping missions Operation Sangaris by France and MISCA by the African Union were mounted.

On 20 January 2014, EU foreign ministers reached agreement for the creation of EUFOR RCA, which is the ninth EU military operation in the framework of the Common Security and Defence Policy. On 28 January, United Nations Security Council resolution 2134 approved deployment of the EU force into the Central African Republic. The military operation was established on 10 February, with Major General Philippe Pontiès as its commander.

Deployment 
On 30 April 2014, EUFOR RCA started its first major operation by taking over security at the Bangui M'Poko International Airport.  

The initial force consisted of 150 troops, and was contributed by former colonial power France and by Estonia. During May and June troops from Finland, Georgia, Latvia, Netherlands, Poland, Portugal, Romania and Spain as well as military advisors from Luxembourg joined the force. On 15 June it achieved full operational capability with 700 troops. The EU mission is planned to last for half a year, with the overall goal to secure a safe environment in the Bangui area, and afterwards hand it over to African partners who should arrive with a 12,000 troop United Nations peacekeeper force in September. On 28 August 2014, troops from Italy joined the force with 50 paratroopers from Folgore Parachute Brigade. 

According to some experts, the mission is unlikely to achieve all its objectives in the planned time frame, and training of local security forces will probably continue into 2015.

See also 
 EUFOR Tchad/RCA
 European Union Training Mission in the Central African Republic

References 

Military ground operations of the European Union
21st-century establishments in the Central African Republic
Military history of Africa
Military operations involving Georgia (country)
 EUFOR RCA
Military operations involving Estonia
Military operations involving Spain
Military operations involving the Netherlands
Military operations involving Poland
Central African Republic Civil War